Corcyra nidicolella is a species of snout moth in the genus Corcyra. It was described by Hans Rebel in 1914, and is known from Egypt.

References

Moths described in 1914
Tirathabini
Endemic fauna of Egypt
Moths of Africa